Paccia Marciana was the first wife of Septimius Severus, who later became Roman emperor. They married around 175 and she died of natural causes around 186.

Name and marriage
Her name shows her links to two Roman gentes, the Paccia and the Marcia - the latter also included Marcia, mother of the emperor Trajan and his sister Ulpia Marciana. She originated in Leptis Magna and was of Punic or Libyan origin, but virtually nothing else is known of her. Severus probably met her during his tenure as legate under his uncle - he does not mention her in his autobiography, though he later commemorated her with statues when he became Emperor.

Disputed issue

The Historia Augusta claims that Marciana and Severus had two daughters but their existence is nowhere else attested. It appears that the marriage produced no surviving children, despite lasting for more than ten years. Aurelius Victor, Eutropius and the unknown author of Epitome de Caesaribus state that she and not Severus' second wife Julia Domna was the mother of Caracalla, though this is now disregarded and thought to be linked to their claims that Julia married Caracalla. Julia Domna is widely accepted to be the mother of both Caracalla and his younger brother Geta.

Severan dynasty family tree

References

2nd-century births
186 deaths
2nd-century Roman women
Paccii
People of Africa (Roman province)
Family of Septimius Severus
2nd-century Punic people
Wives of Roman emperors